Christopher Rawlinson (1677–1733) of Carke Hall in Cartmell, Lancashire, was an English antiquary.

Origins
He was born on 13 June 1677 at Springfield in Essex, the second son of Curwen Rawlinson of Carke Hall in Cartmell, Lancashire, a Member of Parliament for Lancaster in 1688, by his wife Elizabeth Monck, a daughter and co-heiress of Nicholas Monck, Bishop of Hereford, a younger brother of George Monck, 1st Duke of Albemarle (1608–1670) KG.

Career
He matriculated at Queen's College, Oxford, on 14 June 1695.
He inherited his father's estates. In 1723 he erected to the memory of his grandfather Nicholas Monck, Bishop of Hereford, a pyramidical monument in black and white marble in St. Edmund's Chapel, Westminster Abbey.

Works
He devoted himself to Anglo-Saxon studies and in 1698 published (with assistance from Edward Thwaites), the Saxon text of the Consolation of Philosophy by  Boethius, from a transcript at Oxford made by Francis Junius. It was printed with the Junian font. Rawlinson had made valuable collections for the history of Lancashire, Westmoreland, and Cumberland, all of which have probably perished. The antiquary Sir Daniel Fleming had, however, copied extracts from the part relating to Westmoreland, which were deposited in the collection of manuscripts at Rydal Hall, and were used in about 1777 by Richard Burn and Joseph Nicolson for their work Westmoreland and Cumberland.

Death, burial & legacy
He died unmarried and intestate on 8 January 1733 in Holborn Row, London and was buried in the abbey church of St Albans, Hertfordshire. His portrait, engraved by Joseph Nutting, with those of other members of his family, is in the Bodleian Library, Oxford. His estates passed to his cousins, the issue of his father's sisters Anne and Katherine. Following his death the furniture of Carke Hall was sold by auction and his manuscripts were at the same time sold for a few pennies in bundles to the villagers.

References

Attribution

1677 births
1733 deaths
English antiquarians
Burials at St Albans Cathedral
People from Cartmel
People from the City of Chelmsford